Zilla is a genus of plants in the family Brassicaceae, that grows in the Sahara-Arabian extreme deserts, in Northern Africa and the Middle East.

Species
Species include the following, and possibly others:

 Zilla macroptera
 Zilla spinosa

Formerly placed here:
 Physorhynchus chamaerapistrum, formerly Zilla chamaerapistrum and Zilla schouwioides

Description
Their flowers are light violet.

References

Brassicaceae
Brassicaceae genera